Lech Poznań II is the reserve team and the senior academy team of Lech Poznań, a Polish professional football club based in Poznań. The team and its facilities are based in Wronki.

They currently play in the third tier of the league pyramid, the highest league a reserve team is allowed to play in.

Overview
The team is intended to be the final step between Lech's academy and the first team, and usually consists promising youngsters between the age of 15 and 22, with a few veteran players drafted in to provide experience.

Occasionally, first team players are included in line-ups, to give them an opportunity to regain match fitness.

History
They are known for the remarkable feat of winning all 36 games in the 1994-95 IV liga; it was the last season where 2 points were awarded for a win (instead of 3 points), which meant they finished on 72 points (would have been 108 in a 3pt system).

They gained promotion in the 2003–04 season to the third tier after winning the league and beating Jarota Jarocin 2–0 twice, 4–0 on aggregate. In that same season they reached the First Round of the Polish Cup but were knocked out by Górnik Konin 3–1. In the 2006–07 season the reserve teams were scrapped in favour of a central youth league, but in the 2013–14 season they were reinstated, meaning that between 2007 and 2013 the team ceased to exist. They were reinstated to their previous league position for the 2013–14 season.

They won promotion to II liga at the end of the 2018/19 season, making them the highest placed reserves team in Poland at the time.

Current squad

Other players under contract

Out on loan

Coaching staff

Stadium 
The Amica Stadium is a small, modern venue with undersoil heating. The ground holds just over 5,000 spectators – a third of the town's population – and has floodlighting. The stadium staged three games during the 2006 UEFA U-19 European Championships held in Poland. It used to be the home of Amica Wronki.

References

Bibliography 
 Jarosław Owsiański, Lech Poznań – przemilczana prawda, Poznań: Drukarnia Beyga, 2017, 978-83-939221-6-1.

 
Football clubs in Poznań
Association football clubs established in 1922
1922 establishments in Poland
Railway association football clubs in Poland
Reserve team football in Poland